Nola involuta is a moth of the family Nolidae first described by Harrison Gray Dyar Jr. in 1898. It was described from California and occurs from southern California to southern Texas. It is consistently different in wing markings from Nola apera to which it has been placed as a synonym.

References

involuta
Moths of North America
Moths of Central America
Fauna of the California chaparral and woodlands
Moths described in 1898
Taxa named by Harrison Gray Dyar Jr.